The Military Anthem of the Eighth Route Army is a patriotic song of the People's Republic of China, since Eighth Route Army is a special army in National Revolutionary Army of Republic of China, it also can be considered as a patriotic song of Republic of China.  This song is one of the six songs in Chorus of Eighth Route Army(), all songs are written by Gong Mu, musiced by Zheng Lücheng.

Lyrics

External links
1963 music video of the song with Chinese/English subtitles
A modern rendition of the military anthem
Orchestral and Choral MP3 Audio from PLA Daily

Mandarin-language songs
Chinese patriotic songs
Chinese military marches
Songs about the military
Maoist China propaganda songs
Asian anthems